David Anthony Higgins (born December 9, 1961) is an American actor. He is known for his television roles as Craig Feldspar on Malcolm in the Middle, Joe on Ellen, and Reginald Bitters on Big Time Rush. He also had a recurring role as Harry on the television series Mike & Molly.

Early life and education
Higgins was born on December 9, 1961, in Des Moines, Iowa, one of five children (including brothers Steve and Alan) of Marian Higgins (née Coppola; 1932–2011) and Harold Higgins, the latter of whom was a janitor at West Des Moines schools. After receiving encouragement from a fourth-grade teacher, he won a scholarship to the Des Moines Playhouse and performed in several summer operettas. He was raised in Des Moines and graduated from Theodore Roosevelt High School in 1980. He attended the University of Iowa, where he studied liberal arts until he realized he wanted to pursue a career in entertainment.

Career
Higgins, along with his brother Steve and Dave Gruber Allen, performed in a comedy troupe, Don't Quit Your Day Job, and performed at notable places, including Des Moines' Hotel Kirkwood. Eventually they toured in other states, including California, and were so well received that they were offered their own show, The Higgins Boys and Gruber, on HBO's The Comedy Channel in 1989. After the show ended in 1991, they each pursued separate careers in comedy.

Higgins received his big break when cast as outspoken barista Joe in the sitcom Ellen in 1994. In 1997, he appeared in the Dave Foley film The Wrong Guy, which he also co-wrote with Foley and The Simpsons writer Jay Kogen.

Higgins is perhaps most well recognized for his roles as Craig Feldspar in Malcolm in the Middle and Mr. Bitters in Big Time Rush. He also guest starred on Nickelodeon's True Jackson, VP as Dave. He later appeared in three episodes of American Horror Story: Murder House as minor character Stan. He began a recurring role as Harry in season two of the CBS series Mike & Molly, and was eventually upgraded to a series regular in season three.

Personal life
In 2000, he married his wife Julia, and they have two children. They live in Studio City, California. In 2004, Higgins was featured in a Hollywood edition of the Discovery Channel series Body Challenge, where he worked with a personal trainer. He is a fan of Laurel and Hardy and Buster Keaton.

Filmography

Film

Television

References

External links
 
 

1961 births
21st-century American comedians
American male comedians
American male screenwriters
American male television actors
American television writers
Comedians from California
Living people
Male actors from Des Moines, Iowa
American male television writers
People from Studio City, Los Angeles
Screenwriters from Iowa
Screenwriters from California
University of Iowa alumni
Writers from Des Moines, Iowa
21st-century American screenwriters
21st-century American male writers
Theodore Roosevelt High School (Iowa) alumni